Ngāpuhi / Ngāti Kahu ki Whaingaroa are a Maori iwi from the Whangaroa harbour area in Northland, New Zealand.

The iwi's rohe (tribal territory) covers

Two similarly named iwi ⁠— Ngāpuhi and Ngāti Kahu ki Whangaroa ⁠— are also located in Northland.

See also
Ngāti Kahu ki Whangaroa
List of Māori iwi

References

External links
 Official website